Utazi Godfrey Chukwuka  CON (born 16 October 1961 in Nkpologu, Uzo Uwani, Nigeria) is a Nigerian politician. He is the senator representing Enugu North senatorial district in the Nigerian Senate. He is a senator of the 8th and 9th Senate of  Nigeria. Chukwuka was first elected on 9 June 2015.

He obtained his first School Leaving Certificate from Community Primary School Opanda-Nimbo in 1976; and his West African School Certificate (WASC) from St. Vincent Secondary School, Agbogugu in 1982.

For his tertiary education, he initially attended the College of Education in Awka, Anambra State but completed at the University of Nigeria, Nsukka where he obtained a Bachelor’s degree in Government and Politics Education in 1989. Desirous of an all-round career development and conscious of the task ahead, he enrolled into the Faculty of Law of the University of Nigeria and, despite the many challenges, obtained a Bachelor’s degree in Law. He attended the Nigerian Law School and was called to the Nigerian Bar in 2004.

Works 
He sponsored the motion for sustained immunization to eradicate polio virus not only away from Nigeria but also Africa.

References

External links 
 Utazi Chukwuka official website

Living people
1961 births
People from Enugu State
Enugu State politicians
Members of the Senate (Nigeria)